Halina Reijn (born 10 November 1975) is a Dutch actress, writer and film director.

Early life and education
Halina Reijn was born on 10 November 1975 in Amsterdam, Netherlands, to Fleur ten Kate and Frank Volkert Reijn (1931-1986). Reijn's parents were both artists. She is the middle child of three daughters, with an older sister named Leonora and a younger named Esther. Her father was gay despite being in a heterosexual marriage with her mother. Reijn grew up in an anthroposophy household, and her parents were followers of the Subud spiritual movement. In her early years, she grew up in a "Pippi Longstocking" house with her family in the tiny village of Wildervank, Groningen, which attracted many artists. They lived without television and never visited the cinema, instead they played music, drew and painted; her father built a theater room with a podium and flats for her. When she was around six or seven years old she and one of her sisters wanted to join the Catholic Church, to the shock of their parents. After they relented, the children would go to Sunday school, and when Reijn was twelve she was baptised.

Reijn developed an interest in acting when her babysitter brought her along for a showing of Annie, a film adaptation of the Broadway musical, at a local theater when she was six. She stated, "When I saw Annie, I thought, I want that too. I was very jealous of her." With help of her mother, she joined a youth theater in Veendam. Reijn found it inadequate and thought the other children did not take it seriously enough, which led her mother to pursue an audition with the theater collective De Voorziening (precursor to the ) despite her young age.

When she was ten years old, and a year after her parents had amicably separated, her father died suddenly from suffocation caused by undiagnosed pulmonary embolism. Following her father's death, the family moved to a newly built neighborhood of Groningen in order to escape the isolation. She would spend her teenage years at the Vooropleiding Theater in Groningen, which was a grueling youth academy with a highly selective group, where they were giving lessons and had to rehearse every midday.

Career 
Halina Reijn was professionally trained at the Maastricht Academy of Dramatic Arts, where she graduated in 1998. In the middle of her second year in Maastricht, she was asked to join the ensemble at the  where she was offered the role of Ophelia in Hamlet, Subsequently, Theu Boermans, the artistic director, offered her a permanent place at the collective. Among her other performances for De Trust, her portrayal of Lulu in Shopping and Fucking she received the prestigious Dutch theater prize, the Colombina, as "Best Supporting Actress" in 1998.

She also had a role in a short called Temper! Temper! written and directed by Frank Lammers, which was part of Kort Rotterdams, a five-part series highlighting common elements of Rotterdam's society. In 1998, Reijn branched out into film, with the adaption of the Jan Wolkers's short story De wet op het kleinbedrijf, where she had a principal role in the television film. It was part of the 2000s Cologne Conference, where it was selected among the ten programmes at the TopTen section of the festival. That same year she played a bit part as a sex worker in Martin Koolhoven's breakout film, Suzy Q, which featured Reijn's lifelong friend Carice van Houten in the title role. Despite its warm critical reception and launching the careers of the people involved, the movie was never released on home video, in theaters or shown outside its home country due to music license issues with artists like The Rolling Stones and Jimi Hendrix among others.

Reijn made her big screen acting debut in De Omweg (also known as "The Detour"), a semi-autobiographical drama directed and written by Frouke Fokkema. It opened in Dutch theaters on 7 November 2000. On 1 January 2001, 3 years after Reijn joined, De Trust would fuse with another theater company named Art & Pro, they would continue under the new name of de Theatercompagnie. The fusion, however, did not prove fruitful in the long term, the newly formed company was steeped in financial difficulties, infighting between the co-founders, overworked actors and in the later years there would be conflict with the government over subsidies. Further that year, she would star in Nanouk Leopold's directorial debut, tragicomedy , it follows the dysfunctional lives of three friends who all recently turned thirty. The lowbudget film was part of No More Heroes, an initiative started in order to produce films from upcoming Dutch filmmakers. The film was selected for and first premiered at the 2001's International Film Festival Rotterdam, where it was nominated for the Tiger Award. Between her two film releases in 2001, she also participated in De acteurs, a seven part weekly series where fourteen young actors were interviewed and paired up with each other to rehearse scenes from a miniseries created by Kim van Kooten. that same year, Reijn gained further notoriety with her role in the tragicomedy, Zus & Zo, alongside De Trust peers, which was written and directed by Paula van der Oest. The movie revolves around three sisters trying top stop their gay brother from marrying a woman and in doing so securing the family's seaside estate for his own. Reijn played the unsuspecting fiancée. The movie was nominated for Academy Award for Best International Feature Film at the 75th Academy Awards, even though it received mixed reviews. She also starred in her second short, Flicka, as the title role, in which she played a computer programme who is in relationship with a lonely building supervisor, it was produced as part of NTR . And lastly she appeared in the VARA TV Movie Herschreven vriendschap.

In 2002, Reijn featured in four projects. First she played a minor part in Frank Van Passel's Villa des Roses, her first role in an English/French language international co-production, based on the novel of the same name by Willem Elsschot. Her next two projects were on television with the short TV drama De afrekening and the TV Movie Ware Liefde. She also had a very small role in Moonlight, Paula van der Oest's follow-up movie, an English-language thriller. Meanwhile, back on stage she performed her first role for Toneelgroep Amsterdam, with Ivo van Hove as director she took on the role of courtesan Poppea in Con Amore. At the time, while she was still connected with De Trust, she got 'loaned out' to TGA. For De Theatercompagnie she returned to the role of Ophelia in Hamlet, a character she played previously, for a new rendition of the Shakespearean classic.

In 2003, she joined the ensemble at Toneelgroep Amsterdam, under the direction of future long-time collaborator Ivo van Hove. Around that time she also completed her final performance for De Theatercompagnie, with a new production of The Seagull, where she played Nina. In her first year, with the Toneelgroep Amsterdam, she starred in two plays: She played Irina in the Three Sisters, based upon the play of Anton Chekhov of the same name, and Eugene O'Neill's Mourning Becomes Electra, a co-production with the Toneelschuur, for the latter performance, in which she played Lavinia, she was nominated for a Theo d'Or for "Best Female Actress" in 2004. On television she starred in two telefilms, she played Ewouds's girlfriend in Boy Ecury and Hostess Patty in Het wonder van Máxima, they were aired on public television on 2 and 9 April respectively.

Reijn had three big screen releases in 2003. Her first appearance was as Polleke's mother, Tina, in the family film Polleke, a film adaption of Guus Kuijer's children's book. At first, she was bewildered why she approached by director Ineke Houtman for the role of Polleke's mother, at the time she viewed herself too young to play a mother, but later accepted the role when delving into the character's story. The movie premiered on October, 11 as the opening film of the Cinekid festival. Her next feature film was with director-writer Alex van Warmerdam, called Grimm, in which she had the female leading role. The story is loosely based on Grimm Brothers's Brother and Sister, in which  a brother and sister are abandoned by their father in a forest; in a note their mother urges them to go to Spain to meet up with their uncle. The movie was first shown at SSIF, before released nationwide in the Dutch theaters in early December. Compared to the directors earlier work, Grimm was a critical and financial disappointment. Dissatisfied with the original cut, director Alex van Warmerdam together with editor Job ter Burg went back to the original and reworked the entire film. The new cut premiered at 2019's Netherlands Film Festival. Reijn then starred in Maarten Treurniet's directorial debut Father's Affair, where she played Ellen, the girlfriend of Peter Paul Muller's character and best friend of his deceased wife, who is notified by his GP that he is infertile, which leads to a desperate search for the biological father of his fourteen-year-old son. For her performance as Ellen, Reijn was nominated for best actrice at the Golden Calfs. In March 2004, both Polleke and Father's Affair, were awarded the Golden Film by the Netherlands Film Festival for having sold 100,000 tickets at the box office.

Compared to her previous years, 2004 was a year of rediscovery and recuperation for Reijn. During a production of Mourning Becomes Electra she approached and told Ivo van Hove: "Take me out of everything, remove me from all your plans, because I can't handle it anymore". She started to resent her work and needed a time-out from her work, friends and home. She was granted unpaid leave by Toneelgroep Amsterdam. In April of that year, on invitation of Renée Missel, who she met at the Oscars that spring, she travelled to Los Angeles. While staying in Los Feliz, and with a scholarship of the VandenEnde Foundation and Fonds Podiumkunsten, she attended an actors and directors lab under the guidance of Judith Weston. The following year, she returned to the stage with Shakespeare's The Taming of the Shrew, where she played the title character. The new interpretation of the play received glowing reviews, Reijn in particular got acclaim for her part as Katherina. Reijn also took part in Masterclass, a hidden camera fake documentary-style television film written and directed Hans Teeuwen. It follows Pierre Bokma playing as himself giving a master class together with his reclusive former mentor Peer Mascini to six theatre students. In the film, Reijn is one of the actors interviewed about their previous experiences with Mancini, the actors involved, however, aren't made aware that they are secretly being recorded. Also in 2005, she starred in Erik de Bruyn's poetry short Lentelied, based upon the poem Frühlingslied by J.C. van Schagen.

In 2006, she starred in A Thousand Kisses, directed by Willem van de Sande Bakhuyzen, the final film before his death. It was released on March 9 in Dutch theaters. That same week, Huis van de toekomst (House of the Future) had its premiere at the Compagnietheater, Amsterdam. The multimedia play, written and directed by Carina Molier, stars a group of actors living in Big Brother-style house playing fictionalized versions of intellectuals, who Molier had previously interviewed, engaging in a science experiment. The piece also included video that was recorded prior and the actors could be viewed from every angle by the audience, who were also followed by a camera crew. Reijn played a media expert named Anna Tabaknikova that was based on Maja Kuzmanovic. She next played as the central character in  Hedda Gabler. In contrast with other portrayals, Reijn approached the character in a more messy, unkept way who is more direct and frank in her dealings with others. While her performance received praise, the play itself was viewed less favourably.

Reijn then starred in Black Book, a World War II drama-thriller co-written and directed by Paul Verhoeven and co-starring Carice van Houten and Sebastian Koch. Set in Nazi occupied Netherlands, the film featured her as Ronnie, an opportunist who prioritizes her own luxury and survival during the war in contrast with Rachel Steinn (van Houten), a Jewish woman on the run, who gets involved with the Dutch resistance. She originally auditioned for the lead role, but was passed over in favour of van Houten and was given the part of Ronnie instead; Verhoeven found her appearance a better match for the latter character, they wanted a softer less pronounced look for the protagonist. The international co-production, with a total production cost of 21 million dollars, is the most expensive Dutch film every made. The movie had its world premiere at the 63rd Venice Film Festival, where it was nominated for the Golden Lion. It was the 2007's Dutch entry for the Academy Awards as Best Foreign Language Film, but was not selected. For her performance, she was nominated for her second Golden Calf and a Rembrandt Award. She would return to the stage with Oresteia, where she portrayed the character of Elektra under the direction of Johan Simons. Oresteia was collaboration between TGA and the Belgian theatre company NTGent.

Following a three-year absence of the play, she would reprise her role in Mourning Becomes Electra for a new season in the first half of 2007. Also that spring, at the 57th Berlin International Film Festival, Reijn was one of the actors selected by the European Film Promotion for the annual Shooting Stars Award. Her next film role was in Tamar van den Dop's first feature film, Blind. In the film she played a withdrawn albino woman, whose face is fully scarred and who has severe insecurities about her appearance that one day gets hired to read for a recently gotten blind man. The role was noted to be a departure for Reijn, at the time she was primarily known for portraying extroverted characters.

In 2008, she portrayed Margarethe von Oven in Valkyrie starring Tom Cruise. De Eetclub, directed by Robert Jan Westdijk and Isabelle by director Ben Sombogaart. In the summer of 2011 Halina is added to the cast of Goltzius & The Pelican Company, directed by Peter Greenaway. In 2013 she plays the title role in the weekly TV series Charlie, a Dutch remake of Showtime's Nurse Jackie. In 2014 she could be seen in box office hit Pak van mijn hart, a romantic comedy for the holiday season.

In 2016/2017 she could be seen in the musical film De Zevende Hemel, It was released in theaters to a mixed critical reception.  On stage in the play Obsession next to Jude Law, this play was a coproduction between Toneelgroep Amsterdam and the Barbican Centre London.

In 2019 she released Instinct, her debut feature as a film director starring Carice van Houten in the leading role. The film won the Variety Piazza Grande Award and received a special mention for best first feature at the Locarno Film Festival and was selected as the Dutch entry for the 92nd Academy Awards. Following the release of Reijn's English-language directorial debut, Bodies Bodies Bodies, A24 acquired rights for the film.

Personal life 
Reijn has a close friendship with fellow Dutch actress Carice van Houten, whom she has known since about 1994. They worked together in movies Black Book and Valkyrie.

In 2013 the two published a book together called Anti Glamour, a (mock) style guide and a celebration of their friendship, as well as a candid look into the unglamourous back-stage side of their lives. Although the two occasionally kiss on camera, and have joked about being lesbians, there is no actual romantic involvement.

Filmography

Film

Directorial credits
 Instinct (2019)
 For the Birds (2021) (short)
 Bodies Bodies Bodies (2022)

Television

TV movies

Theatre

References

External links
 Halina Reijn at Toneelgroep Amsterdam
 Homepage Halina Reijn
 Interview with Halina Reijn at european-films.net 
 
 Halina Reijn at Virtual History

1975 births
20th-century Dutch actresses
21st-century Dutch actresses
Actresses from Amsterdam
Dutch film actresses
Dutch film directors
Dutch screenwriters
Dutch stage actresses
Dutch television actresses
English-language film directors
Golden Calf winners
Dutch Roman Catholics
Converts to Roman Catholicism
Living people
Maastricht Academy of Dramatic Arts alumni